The Tahiti International is an international badminton tournament held in Tahiti, French Polynesia organised by Tahiti Badminton Federation, sanctioned by Badminton World Federation (BWF) and Badminton Oceania. In the last few years, this tournament has been an BWF International Challenge with total prize money US$17.500. In fact, this tournament established since 2009, but not yet sanctioned by the Badminton World Federation.

This tournament held at the University of French Polynesia sports hall in Punaauia. The opening ceremony of this event displayed the Tahitian culture with music and dance.

Previous winners

Performances by nation

References 

Badminton tournaments
Recurring sporting events established in 2009
Sports competitions in French Polynesia
2009 establishments in French Polynesia